Fuqua Lake is a reservoir located in Stephens County, Oklahoma, about  northeast of the city of Duncan on State Highway 29. Constructed in 1962, it is the largest of four reservoirs that comprise the public water supply for Duncan.

The lake was reportedly named for Herbert Breedlove (Babe) Fuqua, an oil businessesperson and politician from Fort Worth, Texas.

It is impounded by an earthen dam that was constructed in 1962.

Lake description
It is operated by the city of Duncan. It is also used for fishing.

Notes

References

Reservoirs in Oklahoma
Infrastructure completed in 1962
Geography of Stephens County, Oklahoma